This season, Bahraini Premier League will be known as the Bahrain Classification Soccer League 2008–09 and will consist of 19 teams which will play each other once. The top 10 teams will join the new Premier League in 2009–10 and the bottom 9 teams will form a new Division 2 championship.

The top two sides enter the 2009 Gulf Club Champions Cup

Final league table

End of season playoff
Al Hadd and Al Hala went into an end of season play-off to determine which side would stay in the Premier League for the following season. Al Hala won the game 1-0 after extra time.

References
Bahrain - List of final tables (RSSSF)

Bahraini Premier League seasons
1
Bah